Kim Tae-hoon (Hangul: 김태훈) (born May 19, 1990, in Guri, Gyeonggi) is a South Korean pitcher for the SSG Landers of the KBO League.

References 

SSG Landers players
KBO League pitchers
South Korean baseball players
1990 births
Living people
People from Guri
Sportspeople from Gyeonggi Province